Digea is a Greek network operator that provides a digital terrestrial television system in Greece for seven nationwide free-to-air channels (Alpha TV, Alter Channel, ANT1, Makedonia TV, Mega Channel, Skai TV and Star Channel). In addition to these free-to-air nationwide stations, the network is open to any other station choosing to use its services.

The name Digea is a word play in Greek: composed of the words "Digital" and "Gaea" (the Greek name for Gaia, the ancient goddess who was the personification of the Earth), literally translated as "Digital Earth". It symbolizes a union of the digital era and the basis for life in our world. The company’s main area of activity is the provision of networking and multiplexing services, both to the above-mentioned shareholders as well as to any legal entity opting to use the company’s services.

Time line
24/09/2009: The first digital broadcasting of Digea consisting of television stations Alpha TV, Alter Channel, ANT1, Makedonia TV, Mega Channel, Skai TV and Star Channel was carried out in the Gulf of Corinth from the transmitting site of Xylokastro.
14/01/2010: Digital broadcasting began in Thessaloniki - Central Macedonia from the transmitting sites of Chortiatis and Philippion.
18/06/2010: Digital broadcasting began in Athens - Attica from the transmitting sites of Hymettus and Aegina.
01/09/2010: Digital broadcasting of regional scale channels TV 0-6, Attica TV, Extra Channel, High TV, MAD TV, MTV Greece, Nickelodeon and Sport TV added in Athens - Attica from the transmitting site of Aegina.
19/11/2010: Digital broadcasting began in Alexandroupoli - South West Thrace from the transmitting site of Plaka.
08/02/2011: Digital broadcasting of regional scale channels Blue Sky, Channel 9, Kontra Channel and TELEASTY added in Athens - Attica from the transmitting site of Aegina.
25/02/2011: Digital broadcasting began in Rhodes from the transmitting site of Monte Smith.
27/05/2011: Digital broadcasting began in Central Thessaly from the transmitting site of Dovroutsi.
09/12/2011: Digital broadcasting began in Northern Aetolia-Acarnania, Preveza and Arta from the transmitting site of Acarnanian Mountains.
03/02/2012: Digital broadcasting began in Patras and Southern Aetolia-Acarnania from the transmitting site of Aroi.
26/06/2013: Digital broadcasting began in Crete from the transmitting site of Malaxa and Rogdia.
27/09/2013: Digital broadcasting began in Messenia and Laconia from the transmitting site of Petalidi.
27/06/2014: Analog-to-digital full switchover throughout Peloponnese areas. Analog signal is due to shutoff and everyone who watches digital TV should retune their TVs.
01/08/2014: Analog-to-digital full switchover throughout Attica areas. Analog signal is due to shutoff and everyone who watches digital TV should retune their TVs.
05/09/2014: Analog-to-digital full switchover throughout Eastern Macedonia and Thrace area and North Aegean areas. Analog signal is due to shutoff and everyone who watches digital TV should retune their TVs.
21/11/2014: Analog-to-digital full switchover throughout Central Macedonia, Thessaly and Central Greece areas. Analog signal is due to shutoff and everyone who watches digital TV should retune their TVs.
19/12/2014: Analog-to-digital full switchover throughout Western Macedonia, Epirus and Ionian Islands areas. Analog signal is due to shutoff and everyone who watches digital TV should retune their TVs.
06/02/2015: Analog-to-digital full switchover throughout Crete, Dodecanese and Aegean Islands areas. Analog signal is due to shutoff and everyone who watches digital TV should retune their TVs.

TV Channels

DIGEA  Multiplex
Alpha TV - private national scale television station
Alter Channel - currently off the air
ANT1 - private national scale television station
Makedonia TV - private national scale television station
Mega Channel - private national scale television station
Open TV - private national scale television station (formerly Epsilon & 902 TV television station, affiliated to the Communist Party of Greece, the television station along with the relevant broadcast license was sold by the party to a private company called A-Horizon Media Ltd, and hence no longer has any affiliation to the party)
Skai TV - private national scale television station
Star Channel - private national scale television station
Action 24 - private regional scale television station of Galatsi - Attica
Attica TV - private regional scale television station of Aspropyrgos - Attica
Blue Sky - private regional scale television station of Irakleio - Attica
Channel 9 - private regional scale television station of Galatsi - Attica
Extra Channel - private regional scale television station of Peristeri - Attica
ART - political party LAOS national scale television station started only in Kallithea - Attica
High TV - private regional scale television station of Athens - Attica
Kontra Channel - private regional scale television station of Tavros - Attica
MAD TV - private regional scale television station of Pallini - Attica
New Epsilon TV - private regional scale television station of Peristeri - Attica
Alert TV - private regional scale television station of Tavros - Attica
Nickelodeon - private regional scale television station of Irakleio and national cable, satellite and IPTV channel - Attica
RISE TV - private regional scale television station of Irakleio - Attica
Smile TV - private regional scale television station of Rizoupoli - Attica

See also
Television in Greece
List of radio stations in Greece

Notes

External links
Official Site 
Digea coverage progress in Greece (table) 

Digital television
Television in Greece
Companies based in Athens
2009 establishments in Greece
Greek brands